Misner space is an abstract mathematical spacetime, first described by Charles W. Misner. It is also known as the Lorentzian orbifold . It is a simplified, two-dimensional version of the Taub–NUT spacetime. It contains a non-curvature singularity and is an important counterexample to various hypotheses in general relativity.

Metric

The simplest description of Misner space is to consider two-dimensional Minkowski space with the metric

with the identification of every pair of spacetime points by a constant boost

It can also be defined directly on the cylinder manifold  with coordinates  by the metric

The two coordinates are related by the map

and

Causality

Misner space is a standard example for the study of causality since it contains both closed timelike curves and a compactly generated Cauchy horizon, while still being flat (since it is just Minkowski space). This is the chronology horizon : there are no closed timelike curves in the region , while every point admits a closed timelike curve through it in the region .

Chronology protection

Misner space was the first spacetime where the notion of chronology protection was used for quantum fields, by showing that in the semiclassical approximation, the expectation value of the stress-energy tensor for the vacuum  is divergent.

References

Further reading

General relativity